Manamulla Maruthaaram is a 1958 Indian Tamil-language film directed by W. R. Subba Rao, starring K. Balaji and B. Saroja Devi.

Cast 
List compiled from the database of Film News Anandan and from the film credits. (See External links)
Dance

Mohana
Madhuri
Shantha
Eswar Lal

Featured Artistes

K. Balaji
K. A. Thangavelu
Muthukrishnan
Nagesh
Sedhupathi
Soundar
Balu
Govindan
Sayeeram
B. Saroja Devi
T. P. Muthulakshmi
Manorama
C. T. Rajakantham
Kumudhini
Gamini
Kalavathi
Baby Premalatha
Seetha
Shanthakumari
Kandhala Devi
P. Susheela

Production 
The film was produced by Padma Films and was directed by M. S. Ramnath and W. R. Subba Rao who also handled the Cinematography. Murasoli Maran wrote the screenplay and dialogues for the original story by Pandit Mukhram Sharma. Art direction was by C. HE. Prasad Rao while the choreography was done by Sampath and Chinni Lal. R. P. Sarathy handled the still photography. The film was shot ast Bharani studios and processed at Madras Cine Lab.

Soundtrack 
Music was composed by K. V. Mahadevan, while the lyrics were penned by A. Maruthakasi.

References

External links 

1950s Tamil-language films
Films scored by K. V. Mahadevan
Indian black-and-white films
Indian drama films